Monterey State Beach is a protected beach on southern Monterey Bay in Monterey County, California. It extends from the city of Monterey to Seaside.

The Seaside end of Monterey State Beach is a popular launch spot for paragliders. Surf fishing is permitted.

See also
 List of beaches in California
 List of California state parks

References

External links 
California State Parks: Monterey State Beach website
Monterey County Convention and Visitors Bureau: Monterey State Beach

California State Beaches
Monterey Bay
Beaches of Monterey County, California
Parks in Monterey County, California
Beaches of Northern California